Niigata 1st district (新潟県第1区, Nigata dai-ikku or 新潟1区, Nigata ikku) is a constituency of the House of Representatives in the National Diet of Japan (national legislature), represented by Chinami Nishimura of the Constitutional Democratic Party of Japan since 2017. It is located in Niigata City, the capital of Niigata Prefecture, and covers central parts of former Niigata City (before 2007). It has the smallest district area among the House districts in Niigata Prefecture. As of 2017, 439,968 eligible voters were registered in the district

History 
Before 1996, the amendment of Public Offices Election Act that introduced FPTP “small” voting system, this area had been part of former Niigata 1st district where three Representatives had been elected by single non-transferable vote. The two candidates contesting the former 1st district, Rokuzaemon Yoshida (LDP) and Nobuyuki Sekiyama (DPJ) had continued to run until 2000.

In the 2003 General Election, the Democratic Party of Japan fielded Chinami Nishimura, former Member of Niigata Prefecture Assembly, who defeated Yoshida in the 2003, 2005 and 2009 elections. In 2012, when the Democratic Party lost the reins of government, Tooru Ishizaki, a new LDP candidate, defeated Nishimura. In 2014, Nishimura was defeated again, but elected through the proportional representation block.

In the 2017 General Election, Nishimura joined the Constitutional Democratic Party, and defeated Ishizaki. Ishizaki was elected through the proportional representation block. In 2020, after Ishizaki was indicted for verbally and physically assaulting his secretary, he left the LDP and ran as a Nippon Ishin no Kai candidate in the 2021 elections.

List of representatives

Election Results

References 

Districts of the House of Representatives (Japan)
Niigata Prefecture
Politics of Niigata Prefecture